Trachystolodes tonkinensis is a species of beetle in the family Cerambycidae. It was described by Stephan von Breuning in 1936. It is known from Laos, China, and Vietnam. It contains the varietas Trachystolodes tonkinensis var. pici.

References

Lamiini
Beetles described in 1936